James Edward Stansfield (born 18 September 1978) is an English former professional footballer who played in the Football League for Halifax Town. He began his career with Huddersfield Town but never played for the first team. After leaving Halifax he played non-league football for clubs including Ossett Town, Liversedge, Bradford Park Avenue, Guiseley, Liversedge again, and Frickley Athletic.

His great-grandfather Jack Stansfield was also a footballer; both played for Bradford (Park Avenue).

References

External links
 

1978 births
Living people
Association football defenders
Bradford (Park Avenue) A.F.C. players
English Football League players
English footballers
Footballers from Dewsbury
Frickley Athletic F.C. players
Guiseley A.F.C. players
Halifax Town A.F.C. players
Harrogate Railway Athletic F.C. players
Huddersfield Town A.F.C. players
Liversedge F.C. players
Mossley A.F.C. players
Ossett Albion A.F.C. players
Ossett Town F.C. players
Wakefield F.C. players